Doctor Louis Babrow (24 April 1915 – 26 January 2004) was a South African rugby union player and medical doctor. He was of Jewish origins.

Playing career
He attended, and played for Grey College, Bloemfontein and Cape Town University in South Africa, as well as Guy's Hospital in England, where he finished his medical training.

In 1937, Babrow faced the dilemma of whether or not to play a game against  on Yom Kippur, a Jewish holy day. In the end, Babrow played, with the rationale that he was playing in New Zealand, not his homeland:

"I'm a South African Jew, not a New Zealand Jew and New Zealand is eight hours before South Africa in time. When we are playing our holy day will not yet have dawned in South Africa".

At 22, Babrow was the youngest member of the touring party. One of Babrow's cross-kicks set up a try for Ferdie Bergh to score. He recalled that some members of the Springbok party were Greyshirt sympathisers, but that he never experienced anti-Semitism on the tour.

Test history

Personal life and opinions
Babrow was the cousin of Morris Zimerman, the first Jewish Springbok.

Babrow was a lifelong opponent of apartheid, campaigning for the release of Bram Fischer, the radical lawyer, and against the whitewashing of the Steve Biko affair.

In 2004 he said:
"Rugby in South Africa has always had its prejudices and it could take another 20 years until those issues are sorted out in the game. But if you look at the game in the country now, for the first time ever there is not one Jewish player in the Currie Cup [in 2004].

"It used to be a good luck superstition for the Boks to have at least one Jewish player and a policeman in the side. Now there are neither."

In 2004, Babrow voiced concern that rugby was becoming mainly an Afrikaner sport in South Africa.

Professional career
Babrow was an elected member of the Medical and Dental Council for 21 years, and was on the University of Cape Town council for twenty five years.

See also
List of select Jewish rugby union players
List of South Africa national rugby union players – Springbok no. 246

Bibliography
 Godwin, Terry The Complete Who's Who of International Rugby (Blandford Press, England, 1987)

References

External links
 SA veteran concerned for rugby's future
 Book review: The Glory of the Game, about the Ten Jewish Springboks.
 Springbok Rugby Hall of Fame - Louis Babrow

South African rugby union players
South Africa international rugby union players
Jewish rugby union players
Jewish South African anti-apartheid activists
20th-century South African physicians
University of Cape Town alumni
People from Mohokare Local Municipality
1915 births
2004 deaths
Jewish South African sportspeople
Western Province (rugby union) players
Rugby union players from the Free State (province)
Rugby union centres